Mario Oscar Gerosa (born 27 April 1967 in Rosario, Argentina) is an Argentine-born Italian former rugby union player, coach and a current sports director. He played as a wing.

Gerosa first team was Club Atlético del Rosario, where he won the Nacional de Clubes in 1987. He would play there from 1984/85 to 1990/91. He had 2 caps for Argentina in 1987, winning the South American Rugby Championship the same year. He still scored 4 tries, 16 points on aggregate.

Gerosa moved to Piacenza Rugby Club in 1991/92, where he would stay until 1996/97. He adopted Italian citizenship, being called for Italy, where he had 7 caps, from 1994 to 1995, scoring 4 tries, 20 points on aggregate. He was called for the 1995 Rugby World Cup, playing two games and scoring a try in 31-25 win over Argentina, at 4 June 1995, in East London. That would be his last cap for the national team.

He returned to Argentina, playing for Rosario, from 1998/99 to 2009/10, when he finished his player career, aged 43 years old. He later would be his team coach and sports director.

References

External links

1967 births
Living people
Argentine rugby union players
Argentina international rugby union players
Argentine rugby union coaches
Italian rugby union players
Italy international rugby union players
Italian rugby union coaches
Club Atlético del Rosario rugby union players
Rugby union wings
Argentine emigrants to Italy
Sportspeople from Rosario, Santa Fe